Rheumatoid vasculitis is skin condition that is a typical feature of rheumatoid arthritis, presenting as peripheral vascular lesions that are localized purpura, cutaneous ulceration, and gangrene of the distal parts of the extremities.

See also 
 Rheumatoid nodulosis
 List of cutaneous conditions

References

External links 

Inflammatory polyarthropathies